The Centro de Investigación y Docencia Económicas  ("Center for Research and Teaching in Economics"; CIDE) is a Mexican center of research and higher education, specialized in the fields of social sciences, with an international-grade level of excellence. It is financed with public resources. It has been consistently included in the Global Go To Think Tank reports as one of Mexico's top ten think tanks.

The main campus is located in the Santa Fe hills of Mexico City, with another campus in the city of Aguascalientes in the north-central region of Mexico.

Academic Organization

CIDE has seven academic divisions:  Economics, Public Administration, International Studies, Political Studies, Legal Studies, History and Multidisciplinary Studies.

The center's organizational structure reflects its pluralistic roots and its orientation towards promoting leadership and innovation.  This flexibility allows faculty and alumni to pursue both individual interests and institutional priorities related to CIDE's three core functions:  teaching, research, and outreach to the public and decision-makers.

Faculty

The diverse faculty at CIDE form a research community.  Investigative work combines scientific rigor with social relevance; it aims to address the challenges Mexico faces.  The academic staff is both Mexican and foreign and the majority are registered with the National System of Researchers.

Academic programs

CIDE currently offers four undergraduate programs 
Political Science and International Relations
Economics
Law
Public Policy

Six full-time masters programs 
Economics
Public Administration and Policy
Environmental Economics
Political Science
International History
Methods for Public Policy Analysis

Two half time masters programs 
Public Management
Journalism and Public Policy

Three PhD programs in 
Public Policy
Political Science
Applied History

Distinguished Faculty
Distinguished former/current residents/professors/researchers of CIDE include:
José Miguel Insulza, Chilean interior minister, Secretary General of the Organization of American States
Rodrigo Malmierca Díaz, Cuban diplomat, United Nations Permanent Representative
Bernardo Sepúlveda Amor, Mexican foreign secretary, International Court of Justice judge
Pedro Vuskovic, Chilean economist and politician, Economics Minister under Salvador Allende
Javier Laynez Potizek, Mexican jurist, Justice at the Second Chamber of the Supreme Court of Justice of the Nation
Arturo Zaldívar Lelo de Larrea, Mexican jurist, Justice at the First Chamber of the Supreme Court of Justice of the Nation
Ana Laura Magaloni Kerpel, Mexican jurist, Congresswoman at the Constituent Assembly of Mexico City
Leticia Bonifaz Alfonzo, Mexican jurist, President of the Human Rights Direction at the Supreme Court of Justice of the Nation
Eduardo Sojo, Mexican economist and politician.
Max Diener Sala, Mexican jurist, Tax Attorney General of Mexico.
Jean Meyer, Mexican historian.
Kurt Unger, Economist.
David Miklos, Mexican writer.
Reyes Rodríguez Mondragón, Mexican jurist, Former Dean of the CIDE Law School, Judge at the Superior Chamber of The Electoral Tribunal of the Federal Judiciary

References

External links
Centro de Investigación y Docencia Económicas
BIIACS (Banco de Información para la Investigación en Ciencias Sociales)
Métrica de la transparencia
La estructura de la rendición de cuentas en México
Diagnóstico del funcionamiento del sistema de impartición de justicia a nivel nacional
México Estatal
México, las Américas y el Mundo
Programa de estudios de seguridad pública y estado de derecho
Telecom CIDE
Arbitralex (Información en Línea sobre Arbitraje)
Debatiendo la Reforma Política en México
ResearchGate
Academia
Fullbrigt
NACLE

Public universities and colleges in Mexico
Universities in Mexico City
Think tanks based in Mexico